9 Dead Alive is the fourth studio album by Mexican guitar duo Rodrigo y Gabriela released on April 25, 2014 in Ireland and on April 29, 2014 internationally. According to their Twitter, "each track is a personal celebration of individuals who have passed on, but through their deeds and words still resonate in the 21st century", and is said to be a more rock-focused album compared to their Latin-focused material of the past. Its first single is "The Soundmaker", which is inspired by Spanish guitarist Antonio de Torres Jurado.

Track listing

Charts

References

Rodrigo y Gabriela albums
2014 albums
Rubyworks Records albums
Concept albums